Nikolaos "Nikos" Kaklamanakis (born August 19, 1968, in Athens) is the Greek Gold-medal winner who lit the Olympic torch in the opening ceremony of the 2004 Summer Olympics in Athens. He was named one of the 1996 Greek Male Athletes of the Year.

Kaklamanakis participated in five consecutive Olympic Games from 1992 to 2008, reaching the medal race in all five of them. He won the gold medal at the 1996 Olympics in Atlanta and the silver medal at the 2004 Olympics in Athens, while he was ninth in Barcelona (1992), sixth in Sydney (2000) and eighth in Beijing (2008).

Biography
One of the most popular athletes in Greece, Nikolaos Kaklamanakis is a three-time Mistral class windsurfing world champion and a gold medalist at the  1996 Summer Olympics in Sailing.  He won silver in the event at the 2003 World Championships in Cádiz, Spain, behind Przemek Miarczynski of Poland. In the 2000 Summer Olympics he took the 6th place, while in the 2004 Summer Olympics in Athens, Kaklamanakis took the silver medal behind Gal Fridman of Israel. Four years later, in the 2008 Beijing Olympic Games he finished 8th in the RS:X Men Sailing Race.

Selected achievements

References

External links 
 
 
 
  Lighting the Olympic cauldron

1968 births
Living people
Olympic sailors of Greece
Greek male sailors (sport)
Greek windsurfers
Olympic gold medalists for Greece
Olympic silver medalists for Greece
Sailors at the 1992 Summer Olympics – Lechner A-390
Sailors at the 1996 Summer Olympics – Mistral One Design
Sailors at the 2000 Summer Olympics – Mistral One Design
Sailors at the 2004 Summer Olympics – Mistral One Design
Sailors at the 2008 Summer Olympics – RS:X
Olympic cauldron lighters
Olympic medalists in sailing
Medalists at the 2004 Summer Olympics
Medalists at the 1996 Summer Olympics
Mediterranean Games gold medalists for Greece
Competitors at the 1993 Mediterranean Games
Mediterranean Games medalists in sailing
Sailors (sport) from Athens